{{DISPLAYTITLE:C22H30O2}}
The molecular formula C22H30O2 (molar mass: 326.48 g/mol, exact mass: 326.2246 u) may refer to:

 Anordiol, or anordriol
 Promegestone

Molecular formulas